Paul Ebiye Hamilton (31 July 1941 – 30 March 2017) was a Nigerian footballer and manager. He died at the Military Hospital in Lagos, Nigeria.

Career
He spent the bulk of his playing career (1961-1975) with NEPA Lagos.

Coaching career
After retirement he was hired as coach of the U-20 national team. He was then hired as head coach of the Nigeria national football team in 1989 but was fired  after Nigeria failed to qualify for the 1990 FIFA World Cup. He went on to coach the female national team for their first World Cup. He received his UEFA coaching license in summer 2006.

Later life
He was said to have been diagnosed with heart and kidney related health issues some months ago,.
 
He had his left leg amputated as the result of many injuries. He died after a long illness in March 2017.

External links
Interview on CompleteSportsNigeria.com

References

1941 births
2017 deaths
Footballers at the 1968 Summer Olympics
Olympic footballers of Nigeria
Nigeria international footballers
1963 African Cup of Nations players
Nigerian footballers
Nigerian football managers
Nigeria national football team managers
NEPA Lagos players
Nigerian amputees
Nigeria women's national football team managers
Association football midfielders
1995 FIFA Women's World Cup managers